Minister of External Relations of Angola is a cabinet level position in the national government. The position was established in 1975 with José Eduardo dos Santos, later president of Angola. Angola's current foreign minister Tete António has served in the role since 9 April 2020.

List of ministers
 1975–1976: José Eduardo dos Santos
 1976–1984: Paulo Teixeira Jorge
 1984–1985: José Eduardo dos Santos
 1985–1989: Afonso Van-Dúnem M'Binda
 1989–1992: Pedro de Castro Van-Dúnem
 1992–1999: Venâncio da Silva Moura
 1999–2008: João Bernardo de Miranda
 2008–2010: Assunção dos Anjos
 2010–2017: Georges Rebelo Chikoti
 2017–2020: Manuel Domingos Augusto
 2020–present: Tete António

References

External links
 
 List of Ministers of External Relations of Angola

Foreign
Foreign Ministers
Politics of Angola